Eddie Davis (born January, 1903 in New York, NY, date of death unknown) was an American film director who worked extensively in television.

In the late 1960s he made three films in Australia for Goldsworthy Productions, whose head of production, Warwick Freeman, described Davis as a "nice guy and he taught us all a lot about the rudiments of production."

Select credits
Panic in the City (1968)
It Takes All Kinds (1969)
Color Me Dead  (1970) aka D.O.A. II
That Lady from Peking  (1971)

References

External links

1903 births
American film directors
Year of death missing